The Philippines Ladies Open was a professional golf tournament in the Philippines on the Ladies Asia Golf Circuit.

Winners

Source:

See also
Philippine Open

References

External links
Ladies Asian Golf Tour

Ladies Asian Golf Tour events
Golf tournaments in the Philippines